The Army of Darkness Roleplaying Game is a role-playing game published by Eden Studios, Inc. in 2005.

Description
The Army of Darkness Roleplaying Game is based on the film Army of Darkness.

Cinematic Unisystem was adopted for use in Army of Darkness.

Publication history
Shane Lacy Hensley designed the role-playing game Army of Darkness (2005) for Eden Studios. The Army of Darkness Roleplaying Game was published by Eden Studios, Inc. in 2005.

Reception

Reviews
Pyramid

References

Eden Studios games
Role-playing games based on films
Role-playing games introduced in 2005
The Evil Dead (franchise)